The 1954 North Dakota State Bison football team was an American football team that represented North Dakota State University during the 1954 college football season as a member of the North Central Conference. In their first year under head coach Del Anderson, the team compiled a 1–7–1 record.

Schedule

References

North Dakota State
North Dakota State Bison football seasons
North Dakota State Bison football